The GTR-18A, commonly known as the Smokey Sam, is a small unguided rocket developed by Naval Air Warfare Center Weapons Division (NAWCWD) in China Lake, California as a threat simulator for use during military exercises. Widely used in training, the Smokey Sam remains in operational service with the United States military.

Design and development
The GTR-18 was conceived in the late 1970s by Robert A. McLellan, a Weapons Range Scientist working with Exercise Red Flag at Nellis Air Force Base.  He first searched for a commercially available system that would perform as he envisioned.  It quickly became apparent that no commercial product would perform adequately, so the development of the GTR-18 was undertaken by the Naval Weapons Center (NWC) during the early 1980s, with the intent of developing Mr. McLellan's idea of a simple and inexpensive rocket for visually simulating the launch of surface-to-air missiles (SAMs) during training exercises.

The design of the GTR-18A rocket is very simplistic and intended for minimal cost with the fuselage and nose cone being constructed from phenolic paper while the fins are constructed out of styrofoam. The fuselage and fins are joined to the nose cone by the motor tube which contains  of X-60 solid fuel propellant. Because of its very light construction, the Smokey Sam will only cause minimal damage even if it accidentally strikes a low-flying aircraft.

Operational history

The complete launch system, known as the Smokey Sam Simulator, includes single-rail  LMU-23/E and four-rail LMU-24/E launching pads, an AN/VPQ-1 radar set, the PVU-3A/E Igniter and the GTR-18A rockets themselves, making up the SMU-124/E system as a whole.

When launched, the GTR-18's rocket motor produces a distinctive white plume, providing a realistic simulation of the launch of a surface-to-air missile. While the ordinary GTR-18A has a simple, model rocket type motor, an improved "Dual Thrust Smokey Sam" tested in the early 2000s featured a modified rocket motor, providing a 1.5 second boost period, followed by a lower-thrust sustainer burn with burnout occurring at 7.1 seconds after launch.

This motor was altered to use a two-part laminated grain propellant which utilized both the standard zinc based grain and a high thrust aluminium based grain as used by other US rockets. The new propellant allows the "Dual Thrust Smokey Sam" to have a boost and sustain signature to better imitate a surface-to-air missile and while thrust is initially low, the higher thrust for the majority of the motors burn time gives an improved trajectory.

The GTR-18A received the altered designation DGTR-18A in the early 1990s, despite the use of the D ("Dummy") prefix usually being limited to non-flying rockets/missiles used for ground handling training only. The Smokey Sam remains in production and operational service, and is extensively used by the U.S. military.

Gallery

Notes

References

Bibliography

External links
  Webpage covering the GTR-18A

Military specifications 
  GTR-18A
  SMU-124/E

Surface-to-air missiles of the United States
Rocket weapons of the United States
Model rockets
Military equipment introduced in the 1980s